Henry Pollard may refer to:

Henry Moses Pollard (1836–1904), U.S. Representative from Missouri
H. B. Pollard, first postmaster of Ashland, Kentucky
 Henry Graham Pollard (1903–1976), British bookseller and bibliographer